Livermore may refer to:

Places in the United States
Livermore, California
Lawrence Livermore National Laboratory, a U.S. Department of Energy lab in Livermore, California
Livermore Valley AVA, California wine region in Alameda County
Livermore, Colorado
Livermore, Iowa
Livermore, Kentucky
Livermore Bridge, south of Livermore, Kentucky
Livermore, Maine
Livermore Falls, Maine
Livermore, New Hampshire
Livermore, Pennsylvania

Other uses
Livermore (surname)

See also
Livermere
Livermorium, the official name for element 116 (formerly called ununhexium), named after the laboratory (and the city)
Justice Livermore (disambiguation)
Liverpool